Munona iridescens is a moth of the family Erebidae first described by William Schaus in 1894. It is found in Mexico, French Guiana, Venezuela, Peru, Brazil and Ecuador.

References

 

Phaegopterina
Arctiinae of South America
Moths described in 1894